Roger Caleb Rogerson (born 3 January 1941) is a former detective sergeant of the New South Wales Police Force, and a convicted murderer.
During Rogerson's career, he was one of the most decorated officers in the police force, having received at least thirteen awards for bravery, outstanding policemanship and devotion to duty including the Peter Mitchell Trophy, the highest annual police award. During his time in office he was implicated in—but never convicted of—two killings, bribery, assault and drug dealing.

In 1999, Rogerson was convicted of perverting the course of justice and lying to the Police Integrity Commission. He is also known for his association with other New South Wales (NSW) detectives who are reputed to have been corrupt, including Ray "Gunner" Kelly and Fred Krahe, and with a number of organised crime figures, including Abe Saffron, Arthur "Neddy" Smith and Christopher Dale Flannery. Smith was a convicted heroin dealer, rapist and armed robber who claimed Rogerson gave him the "green light" to commit crimes in NSW, while Flannery specialised in contract killing.

In May 2014, Rogerson was remanded in prison after being charged, along with fellow former NSW detective Glen McNamara, with the murder of 20-year-old student Jamie Gao, and supply of drugs. Both pleaded not guilty in January 2015. Their trial was started in July 2015, but was aborted after two days because of the potential prejudice caused after McNamara's then-barrister Charles Waterstreet made a reference to Rogerson "killing two or three people when he was in the police force". Following a retrial, both Rogerson and McNamara were found guilty of murder. In September 2016, both were sentenced to jail for life for the murder of Gao.

Biography

Early life
One of three children, Rogerson grew up in the Sydney suburb of Bankstown (moving there from Bondi at six years old). Rogerson's father Owen Rogerson emigrated from Kingston upon Hull, England during his career as a boilermaker; his mother Mabel Boxley emigrated from Cardiff, Wales with her parents as a youth (her English born father Caleb Boxley was the reason for Roger's middle name). Rogerson attended Bankstown Central School and later Homebush Boys High School. In January 1958, he joined the New South Wales Police Cadet Service. He has two daughters by his first wife Joy Archer.

Police career
Rogerson worked on some of the biggest cases of the early 1970s, including the Toecutter Gang Murder and the Whiskey Au Go Go Fire in Brisbane. By 1978, his reputation was sufficient to gain convictions based on the strength of unsigned records of interviews with prisoners (known as "police verbals"). He was brought in to investigate the Ananda Marga conspiracy case, despite having no connections to the Special Branch investigating the case. Tim Anderson, one of the three released in 1985, claimed the confession Rogerson extracted was fabricated, and that he and two other members of the Ananda Marga group were convicted in part because of Rogerson's fabrications.

The Peter Mitchell Award was presented to Rogerson in 1980 for the arrest of escaped armed robber Gary Purdey. This was tainted by Purdey's claims that Rogerson assaulted him, prevented him from calling his solicitor and typed up to five different records of the interview.

Rogerson was responsible for the 1981 shooting death of Warren Lanfranchi. During the inquest, the coroner found Rogerson was acting in the line of duty, but a jury declined to find he had acted in self-defence. However, it was alleged by Lanfranchi's partner, Sallie-Anne Huckstepp, and later by Neddy Smith, that Rogerson had murdered Lanfranchi as retribution for robbing another heroin dealer who was under police protection and for firing a gun at a police officer. Huckstepp, a heroin addict and prostitute, appeared on numerous current affairs programs, including 60 Minutes and A Current Affair, demanding an investigation into the shooting. She also made statements to the New South Wales Police Internal Affairs Branch. Huckstepp was later murdered, her body found in a pond in Centennial Park, New South Wales.

Fellow police officer Michael Drury has alleged that Rogerson was involved in his attempted murder. Drury claims he refused to accept a bribe Rogerson offered in exchange for evidence tampering in a heroin trafficking trial of convicted Melbourne drug dealer Alan Williams. On 6 June 1984, Drury was shot twice through his kitchen window as he fed his three-year-old daughter. Rogerson was charged with the shooting and Williams testified that Rogerson and Christopher Dale Flannery had agreed to murder Drury for  each. However, on 20 November 1989, Rogerson was acquitted.

Rogerson received a criminal conviction, which was overturned on appeal, for involvement in drug dealing, allegedly conspiring with notorious Melbourne drug dealer Dennis Allen to supply heroin.

After the police force
Rogerson was dismissed from the NSW Police Force on 11 April 1986 (had not seen active service since his suspension on 30 November 1984 as a result of the Drury investigation). He was subsequently convicted of perverting the course of justice in relation to  deposited by him in bank accounts under a false name. He spent nine months in jail in 1990 before being released on bail pending an ultimately unsuccessful appeal. He spent a further three years in jail.

After leaving the force, Rogerson worked in the building and construction industry as a supplier of scaffolding. He also became an entertainer, telling stories of his police activities in a spoken-word stage show called The Good, the Bad and the Ugly, with former Australian footballers Warwick Capper and Mark "Jacko" Jackson.

On 17 February 2005, Rogerson and his wife, Anne Melocco, were convicted of lying to the 1999 Police Integrity Commission. Rogerson served twelve months of a maximum two-and-a-half-year sentence. He was released from Kirkconnell Correctional Centre on 17 February 2006. Melocco was sentenced to two years' periodic detention for the same offence. Following his release from prison in 2006, Rogerson resumed his entertainment career with Mark "Jacko" Jackson by appearing in a show called The Wild Colonial Psychos with Jackson and Mark "Chopper" Read.

In 2008, Rogerson reviewed episodes of the Underbelly series and Melbourne's underworld war in The Daily Telegraph He also wrote about the 2009 series of Underbelly for the same paper.

In 2009, he published an autobiography about his time as a detective, entitled The Dark Side, launched by broadcaster Alan Jones.

Murder charge and conviction 

On 27 May 2014, Rogerson was charged with the murder of Sydney student Jamie Gao, allegedly after a drug deal having gone wrong. On 21 January 2015, he and his co-accused, Glen McNamara (also a former police detective), were committed to stand trial over the alleged murder. On 6 March 2015, both accused were arraigned at a hearing in the NSW Supreme Court. Both pleaded not guilty to the murder of Gao and also not guilty to supplying 2.78 kilograms (6.1 lb) of "ice" (methamphetamine). The men were due for trial in the Supreme Court on 20 July 2015. On the second day, the trial was aborted because of the potential prejudice caused after McNamara's then-barrister Charles Waterstreet made a reference to Rogerson "killing two or three people when he was in the police force”.

A new trial started on 1 February 2016. On 15 June 2016, Rogerson and McNamara were found guilty of Gao's murder.

On 25 August 2016, Rogerson and McNamara faced a sentencing hearing. The NSW crown prosecutor, Christopher Maxwell sought for the judge to jail Rogerson and McNamara for life, stating there was no distinction between a contract killing and killing for the purpose of financial gain

One detective witness told the Daily Telegraph "it was like tracking the stars of Amateur Hour", regarding the killing of Jamie Gao.

On 2 September 2016, Justice Geoffrey Bellew sentenced Rogerson and McNamara to life in prison, with the statement "The joint criminal enterprise to which each offender was a party was extensive in its planning, brutal in its execution and callous in its aftermath". Lawyers for both Rogerson and McNamara indicated they would appeal against the sentence. However, neither Rogerson nor McNamara formally lodged appeals, and in July 2019 Rogerson’s last application for an extension of time to do so was refused by the NSW Supreme Court. However, Rogerson then lodged an appeal in 2020.

Extortion allegations
During legal proceedings surrounding the trial against suspects involved in the 2009 contract murder of Michael McGurk, the Supreme Court heard evidence that, while in the Cooma Correctional Centre in 2014, Rogerson, McNamara, and Fortunato "Lucky" Gattellari attempted to extort Ron Medich, a businessman and suspect for masterminding the murder of McGurk.

Involvement in the Whiskey Au Go Go nightclub fire investigation 
Soon after the Whiskey Au Go Go nightclub fire on 8 March 1973, Sydney detectives Roger Rogerson and Detective Sergeant Noel Morey were called to Brisbane to assist in the investigation. This was because John Andrew Stuart, accused of lighting the fire, had said criminals from Sydney were behind the nightclub extortion attempts.

In 1988 Roger Rogerson told a Bulletin reporter that he and the other lead detectives fabricated evidence. They did so because, although they 'knew' Stuart and Finch were involved, they had insufficient evidence to convict them. The police confirmed Rogerson was the 'mole' during an early 1990s secret investigation called 'Operation Graveyard'. The journalist has refused to discuss the matter.

Cultural references
Richard Roxburgh portrayed Rogerson in the 1995 TV mini-series Blue Murder and its 2017 sequel Blue Murder: Killer Cop.

Bibliography

Notes

References
McNab, D. The Dodger – Inside the world of Roger Rogerson, Pan Macmillan, Sydney 2006, 
McNab, D. Killing Mr Rent-A-Kill, Pan Macmillan, Sydney 2012, 
 Goodsir, D. Line of Fire: The inside story of the controversial shooting of undercover policeman Michael Drury, Allen & Unwin, Crows Nest, 1995 
 Royal Commission into the NSW Police Service Final Report – Volume 1 – Corruption
 Royal Commission into the NSW Police Service Final Report – Volume 2 – Reform
 Melbourne, Australia Crime website. Archived from the original
Geesche Jacobsen, Kate McClymont (21 February 2005). The honest cop who pays for the sins of his brother smh.com.au; The Sydney Morning Herald
Roger Rogerson convicted on ASIC charges,  ASIC.gov.au; Australian Securities and Investments Commission (press release), 22 October 2001.
 The life and times of Roger Rogerson The Age Documentary. 

1941 births
Living people
20th-century Australian criminals
21st-century Australian criminals
Australian autobiographers
Australian crime writers
Australian drug traffickers
Australian male criminals
Australian organised crime figures
Australian people convicted of murder
Australian people of Welsh descent
Australian police officers convicted of crimes
Place of birth missing (living people)
Australian prisoners sentenced to life imprisonment
Criminals from New South Wales
Criminals from Sydney
Police detectives
Organised crime in Sydney
People convicted of murder by New South Wales
Police officers convicted of drug trafficking
Police officers convicted of murder
Police officers convicted of planting evidence
Prisoners sentenced to life imprisonment by New South Wales